Gabriela Kučerová (born 28 November 1977) is a German former professional tennis player.

Biography
Kučerová, who is originally from Prague, started playing tennis at the age of seven and was coached by her father Jaroslav, who was a top player in Czechoslovakia. Her elder sister, Magdalena Kučerová, also played on the WTA Tour.

A right-handed player, Kučerová turned professional in 1995 and reached a top singles ranking of 180 in the world, winning four ITF titles. As a doubles player she featured in her only WTA Tour main draw, which came at the 1999 Internationaux de Strasbourg.

ITF finals

Singles (4–2)

Doubles (3–1)

References

External links
 
 사

1977 births
Living people
German female tennis players
Czech emigrants to Germany
Tennis players from Prague